Palaeophilotes is a monotypic genus of butterflies in the family Lycaenidae. Its single species, Palaeophilotes triphysina, (Staudinger, 1892) is endemic to western China.

References

Polyommatini
Lycaenidae genera
Taxa named by Walter Forster (entomologist)